The 1913–14 Maltese First Division was the fourth edition Maltese First Division, won for the first time by Ħamrun Spartans by goal difference.

League table

Results

See also 
 1913 in association football
 1914 in association football

1913-14
1913–14 in European association football leagues
1913 in Malta
1914 in Malta